Alexander Germanovich Preis (1905–1942) was a Soviet writer of numerous plays and libretti, including those for Shostakovich's operas The Nose and Lady Macbeth of the Mtsensk district.

References

Soviet dramatists and playwrights
Soviet male writers
1905 births
1942 deaths
Victims of the Siege of Leningrad